Procidosa is a genus of skipper butterflies in the family Hesperiidae.

References
Procidosa - Natural History Museum Lepidoptera genus database

Hesperiidae
Hesperiidae genera